David Thorne is an Australian former professional rugby league footballer who played in the 1980s and 1990s. He was part of the inaugural Newcastle Knights squad from 1988–89 and then returned to play in 1991.

Australian rugby league players
Newcastle Knights players
Living people
Rugby league props
1965 births
Place of birth missing (living people)